2015 Italian Athletics Indoor Championships was the 46th edition of the Italian Athletics Indoor Championships and were held in Padua for the first time.

Champions

Women

Men

See also
2013 Italian Athletics Championships

References

External links
 FIDAL web site

Italian Athletics Championships
Athletics
Italian Athletics Indoor Championships